The Arrows A23 is a Formula One racing car, used by the Arrows team during the 2002 Formula One season. It was designed by Mike Coughlan, Sergio Rinland and Nicoló Petrucci with engines supplied by Jaguar-works Cosworth customer rather than the Asiatech unit used in the previous year's Arrows A22.

Arrows racing history
The car bore the livery of the team's major sponsor, Orange. The car was completely designed around Jos Verstappen, who had a contract to race for the 2002 season. However, due to financial problems the team replaced him with Heinz-Harald Frentzen on a race by race deal because he could bring more sponsorship money. Rinland designed the car around the twin keel concept he had perfected at Sauber. The A23 was introduced late and had very little pre season testing as a result. Most of the testing and set up work was done by Verstappen before he was abruptly replaced by Frentzen.

Driven by Frentzen and Enrique Bernoldi, the car scored only two championship points. Both cars were disqualified at the opening race. Bernoldi grabbed headlines for taking the fight to Michael Schumacher in Malaysia, proving the A23's competitiveness. While the car had pace, reliability was again its achilles heel although Frentzen felt that the car had good potential however. Mounting debts and legal issues forced the team to pull out of Formula One following the 2002 German Grand Prix. Craig Pollock, who had just been ousted from BAR offered to buy the team, but terms could not be reached. Arrows and by extension TWR were declared insolvent shortly afterwards and folded.

The team's penultimate entry at the French Grand Prix saw both drivers deliberately fail to qualify as the team cut back on engine mileage and repair. On-board data acquisition showed the car to be quick in the first two sectors but noticeably slower in the third and final sector. The team's last actual entry was the following at the 2002 German Grand Prix at a new for 2002 heavily revised and shortened version of the Hockenheimring.

It is possible that Orange were due to terminate their sponsorship around the same time anyway due to making huge financial losses.

Further use by other teams

Minardi

Following the demise of Arrows, the A23 chassis and intellectual property rights to them were bought by Paul Stoddart, then the head of the Minardi team, as a potential replacement for his own team's PS03 chassis.

The chassis was renamed the Minardi PS04, although it was largely unchanged from its condition as raced in the 2002 season. A comparison test next to the Minardi PS03 proved it to have similar performance to the PS03, but possibly more potential. However Minardi was worried about the negative PR from running a "pure-Arrows" and the decision was made to modify the PS03 using Arrows intellectual property and elements from the Arrows A23 for the 2004 season. The resulting car was called the Minardi PS04B.

Super Aguri

Four years later, in 2006, the new Super Aguri F1 team bought remaining unmodified A23 cars and from Minardi. Super Aguri ran them, with some minor modifications, as the Super Aguri SA05 during the first half of the 2006 Formula One season.

Complete Formula One results
(key) (results in bold indicate pole position)

References

2002 Formula One season cars
Arrows Formula One cars